Thomas Towneley O'Hagan, 2nd Baron O'Hagan (5 December 1878 – 13 December 1900), was a British peer and soldier.

He was educated at Sandhurst. He inherited his title at the age of seven, but never took up his seat in the House of Lords before his premature death.

From 1899, he served in South Africa during Boer War as a lieutenant in the 3rd Battalion of Grenadier Guards, but died abruptly of an unknown illness (thought to have been malaria) just over a week after his 22nd birthday. As he died unmarried and without children, the title passed on to his younger brother Maurice.

References

Who Was Who, 1897-2005

1878 births
1900 deaths
Barons in the Peerage of the United Kingdom
Graduates of the Royal Military College, Sandhurst
Grenadier Guards officers
British people of Irish descent
Younger sons of barons